Arthrostylidium ekmanii is an Arthrostylidium species of bamboo native to Central America, the West Indies, northern South America, and southern Mexico.

References

ekmanii